North Tetagouche (Tétagouche-Nord in French) is a local service district in New Brunswick, Canada. It is situated 7 km Western the centre of Bathurst. It is located to the North of Tetagouche river, it is nearly rectangular and borders Dunlop on the Northwest. The most part of its territory is a forest and a residential neighbourhood by the river which links to Route 322.

Advisory Committee
Within the Local service district, North Tetagouche is administered by the Department of Local Government (New Brunswick), assisted by and advisory committee of five members with a president.

Representation
The circumscription of Nepisiguit is represented at the  Legislative Assembly of New Brunswick by Cheryl Lavoie, a member of New Brunswick Liberal Association.

History

Notable people

See also
List of communities in New Brunswick

References

Communities in Gloucester County, New Brunswick
Designated places in New Brunswick